Pimpla are a worldwide genus of the parasitic wasp family Ichneumonidae.

Pimpla species are idiobiont endoparasitoids of Holometabola, often the pupae of Lepidoptera.  For instance, the common Pimpla rufipes parasitizes Pieris brassicae and Lymantria dispar.

They are generally sturdy black wasps with orange markings. The first tergite is box-like with the spiracle anterior to the middle.

This genus includes about 200 species.

Selected species
 Pimpla aethiops Curtis 1828
 Pimpla apricaria Costa 1885
 Pimpla arcadica Kasparyan 1973
 Pimpla arctica Zetterstedt 1838
 Pimpla artemonis Kasparyan 1973
 Pimpla contemplator (Muller 1776)
 Pimpla coxalis Habermehl 1917
 Pimpla dimidiatus (Townes, 1960)
 Pimpla dorsata (Dalla Torre 1901)
 Pimpla flavicoxis Thomson 1877
 Pimpla glandaria Costa 1886
 Pimpla hesperus (Townes, 1960)
 Pimpla illecebrator (Villers 1789)
 Pimpla insignatoria (Gravenhorst 1807)
 Pimpla melanacrias Perkins 1941
 Pimpla murinanae Fahringer 1943
 Pimpla nigrohirsuta Strobl 1902
 Pimpla processioneae Ratzeburg 1849 
 Pimpla rufipes (Miller 1759) - (syn. Pimpla instigator) - black slip wasp
 Pimpla sodalis Ruthe 1859
 Pimpla spuria Gravenhorst 1829
 Pimpla stricklandi (Townes, 1960)
 Pimpla turionellae (C. Linnaeus, 1758)
 Pimpla varians (Townes, 1960)
 Pimpla wilchristi Fitton, Shaw & Gauld 1988

Distribution
The distribution of these wasps is Afrotropical, Eastern and Western Palaearctic, European, Nearctic, Palaearctic, Neotropical.

Gallery

See also
 List of Pimpla species

References
Gavin Broad Identification key to the subfamilies of Ichneumonidae
Cedarcreek
Fauna Europaea
BioLib.cz
Hymenoptera Online (HOL)

Taxonomicon

Pimplinae
Ichneumonidae genera
Taxa named by Johan Christian Fabricius